In pathology, the reticulin stain is a popular staining method in histology.  It is used to visualize reticular fiber and used extensively in liver histopathology.

See also
 H&E stain
 Trichrome stain

References

Staining